New Year Peak is the major peak (about 2,600 m) on the northwest side of Toboggan Gap in the Millen Range, Victory Mountains, Victoria Land. The name was suggested by Bradley Field, geologist, New Zealand Geological Survey, whose field party camped below the peak during the New Year period, 1981–82.

Mountains of Victoria Land
Borchgrevink Coast